The 1967 Singaporean by-elections were triggered by the final batch of mass resignations from Barisan Sosialis's elected Members of Parliament who heeded to Lim Huan Boon's call on the grounds that Singapore's independence was "phony" because no discussion of Singapore's separation matter was made in the legislature. The final walkout of Barisan members were Koo Young, Loh Miaw Gong, Ong Lian Teng, Poh Ber Liak and Tan Cheng Tong, and left five constituencies vacant; Bukit Panjang, Havelock, Jalan Kayu, Tampines and Thomson respectively. As a result, by-elections were held on 7 March 1967, with the nomination day held on 24 February 1967. Despite five constituencies were vacant, only Thomson was contested by two independent candidates a PAP candidate—in which PAP won. PAP also won the other four constituencies by an uncontested walkover.

Election deposit
The election deposit was set at $500.  Similar to previous elections, the election deposit will be forfeited if the particular candidate had failed to secure at least 12.5% or one-eighth of the votes.

Results

Aftermath of this by election
After this by election which saw both independent candidates obtaining less than one-eighth of the votes and had their election deposit forfeited, the parliament is effectively held only by the PAP Members until the famous 1981 Anson by election as the other 2 BS members Chan Sun Wing (Nee Soon) and Wong Soon Fong (Toa Payoh) had opted to flee the country in order to avoid being arrested by the Internal Security Department (ISD) as what happened to their colleague Chia Thye Poh and others.

References

External links
Background of 1967 By election
Results of 1967 By election

1967
Singapore
1967 in Singapore
March 1967 events in Asia